MS Tûranor PlanetSolar,  known under the project name PlanetSolar, founded by the Swiss explorer Raphaël Domjan, is the largest solar-powered boat in the world and launched on 31 March 2010. It was designed and engineered by LOMOcean Marine.

In May 2012, it became the first solar electric vehicle ever to circumnavigate the globe taking 584 days between 2010 and 2012.

The boat was renamed Race for Water in 2015, after the name of the foundation which then operated it. It was dedicated to water conservation missions and to prevent the oceans from plastic pollution. In 2021, new owners Porrima projects renamed the ship Porrima.

Technical characteristics
The 31-metre boat is covered by 537 m2 of solar panels rated at 93 kW, which in turn connect to two electric motors, one in each hull. There are 8.5 tons of lithium-ion batteries in the ship's two hulls. The hull was model tested in wind tunnels and was tank tested to determine its hydrodynamics and aerodynamics. The boat was designed to be used as a luxury yacht after the record attempt was finished.

It is currently being used as an ambassador for the project Race for Water.

The boat is registered in Switzerland and was financed by a German entrepreneur, Immo Ströher and designed by New Zealand naval architect Craig Loomes. Construction cost was €15 million. The name Tûranor, derived from J.R.R. Tolkien's novel The Lord of the Rings, translates to "The Power of the Sun".

Around the world
On 27 September 2010, Tûranor PlanetSolar set off from Monaco to circumnavigate the globe solely with the aid of solar power. One aim of the project was to focus public awareness on the importance of renewable energies for environmental protection.

The boat had a full-time crew of four including:

 Raphaël Domjan of Switzerland, expedition leader
 Christian Ochsenbein of Switzerland, electrical engineer
 Jens Langwasser of Germany, quartermaster
 Patrick Marchesseau of France, skipper for the first half of the voyage from Monaco to Nouméa and the high-risk leg from Abu Dhabi to Port Sudan
 Erwann Le Rouzic of France, skipper for the second half of the voyage from Nouméa to Monaco  

Additional crew members joined the voyage during select legs of the voyage including extra security in the Gulf of Aden.

A significant stopover was Cancún, Mexico, during the 2010 United Nations Climate Change Conference held there from 29 November to 10 December 2010. During the expedition, Tûranor PlanetSolar broke two records: the fastest crossing of the Atlantic Ocean by solar boat and the longest distance ever covered by a solar electric vehicle. Tûranor PlanetSolar returned to Monaco on 4 May 2012 after 584 days sailing around the globe.

2013 voyage and transatlantic record
After an engine refit, Tûranor PlanetSolar broke its own record, crossing the Atlantic Ocean from  Las Palmas to Saint Martin in the Caribbean in only 22 days, four days faster than on the circumnavigation trip. The boat left Las Palmas on 25 April and arrived in Marigot on Saint Martin on 18 May. The trip led to Miami, Florida, and then continued as a scientific expedition along the Gulf Stream. On the return trip the boat reached St John's, Newfoundland, on 1 August 2013 before heading back across the Atlantic.
The story of Tûranor PlanetSolar can be found in Kevin Desmond's 280-page Electric Boats and Ships: a History published by McFarland Books in September 2017.

See also

 Aditya, India's first solar ferry
 MY Ady Gil, biodiesel-powered LOMOcean design
 List of circumnavigations
 List of solar-powered boats
 Solar Impulse, first solar aircraft to circumnavigate the world
 Solar vehicle

References

External links

  (archived)
 PlanetSolar Foundation
 

Solar-powered vehicles
Electric boats
Motor yachts
Catamarans
2010 ships
Circumnavigations
Photovoltaics
Solar power in Switzerland